Languages of the Congo may refer to:

 Languages of the Democratic Republic of the Congo
 Languages of the Republic of the Congo